Peter Hosking may refer to:

 Peter Hosking (cricketer) (born 1932), Australian cricketer
 Peter Hosking (actor) (born 1947), Australian actor and audiobook narrator